Hollandaea sayeriana, sometimes named Sayer's silky oak, is a small species of Australian rainforest trees in the plant family Proteaceae.

They are endemic to restricted areas of the rainforests of the Wet Tropics region of northeastern Queensland, in the region of Mounts Bellenden Ker, Bartle Frere and the eastern Atherton Tableland. They grow as understory trees beneath the canopy of lowlands to tablelands rainforests, up to about  altitude.

 this species has the official, current, Qld government conservation status of "near threatened" species.

In 1886–87, German-Australian government botanist Ferdinand von Mueller formally scientifically described this species, named after his associate, botanical collector William A. Sayer.

References

Proteaceae
Flora of Queensland
Taxa named by Ferdinand von Mueller